The Ascension Cathedral also called Roman Catholic Cathedral of the Ascension.  It is the name given to a religious building belonging to the Catholic Church and serves as the cathedral church of the diocese of Satu Mare. It is located in the city of Satu Mare, in the northern part of Romania.

The Satu Mare cathedral was built between 1830 and 1837 according to plans by József Hilda, using parts of the former baroque cathedral (built in 1786). External architectural details are mostly neoclassical style, while inside prevail Baroque features.

See also
Roman Catholicism in Romania

References

Roman Catholic cathedrals in Romania
Churches in Satu Mare
Roman Catholic churches completed in 1837
Historic monuments in Satu Mare County
19th-century Roman Catholic church buildings in Romania